Birniwa is a Local Government Area of Jigawa State, Nigeria. Its headquarters is in the town of Birniwa.

It has an area of 1,567 km and a population of 142,329 at the 2006 census.

The postal code of the area is 731.

People
Birniwa is a multicultural town with Kanuri, Hausa and Fulani residents. Most of the residents of Unguwar Duguri, Dodori, Musari and Abari are Kanuri (Mangawa), and are the early settlers of the town. While residents of Kofar Fada, Tsangayar liman, Tsangayar kudu, Unguwar sarkin fawa and Tsangayar yamma are Hausa speakers. There are other areas with mixture of tribes.

Economy

Birniwa is blessed with fertile land, which make farming the major occupation of its residents. They massively produce food crops like millet, beans, sorghum, maize, rice and so on. They also produce cash crops, especially sesame, hibiscus, water melon, melon and so on.

The harvesting period of water melon in Birniwa is usually between September and December, though the melon may be available outside this period.

References

Local Government Areas in Jigawa State